Moody with Strings is an album by saxophonist James Moody recorded in 1960 and 1961 and released on the Argo label.

Reception

The Allmusic site awarded the album 3 stars.

Track listing 
 "Dorothee" - 3:11
 "Love For Sale" (Cole Porter) - 3:32
 "Another Day" - 3:50
 "All My Life" (Sidney D. Mitchell, Sam H. Stept) - 3:20
 "I'm Old Fashioned" (Jerome Kern, Johnny Mercer) - 2:25
 "Fools Rush In" (Rube Bloom, Mercer) - 3:34
 "Somerset" - 4:23
 "I Remember Clifford" (Benny Golson) - 4:01
 "Love Walked In" (George Gershwin, Ira Gershwin) - 2:38
 "A Song of Love" - 3:03
 "Dorian Mood" - 4:49

Personnel 
James Moody - alto saxophone, tenor saxophone, flute
Burt Collins, Irvin Markowitz, Don Stratton - trumpet (tracks 2, 5, 7 & 9)
Tom McIntosh, Freddie Zito - trombone (tracks 2, 5, 7 & 9) 
Ray Alonge (tracks 2, 3, 5-7, 9 & 11), John Barrows (tracks 3, 6 & 11), Richard Berg (tracks 2, 5, 7 & 9), Jim Buffington (tracks 3, 6 & 11) - French horn
Phil Bonder, Leon Cohen, Joseph Soldo - woodwinds (tracks 3, 6 & 11)
Don Butterfield - tuba (tracks 2, 5, 7 & 9)
Hank Jones (tracks 1, 4, 8 & 10), Tommy Flanagan (tracks 3, 6 & 11) - piano
John Beal (tracks 1, 4, 8 & 10), George Duvivier (tracks 2, 3, 5-7, 9 & 11) - bass
Tom Gillen (tracks 2, 5, 7 & 9), Osie Johnson (tracks 1, 4, 8 & 10), Charlie Persip (tracks 3, 6 & 11) - drums
Torrie Zito - piano (tracks 2, 5, 7 & 9) arranger, conductor
Unidentified large string orchestra  (tracks 1, 4, 8 & 10)

References 

James Moody (saxophonist) albums
1961 albums
Argo Records albums
Albums arranged by Torrie Zito